Sandy Ridge is an unincorporated community in Stokes County, North Carolina, United States, approximately four miles NNE of county seat Danbury, on North Carolina State Highway 704.

Unincorporated communities in Stokes County, North Carolina
Unincorporated communities in North Carolina